Morris Frederick Bell (August 8, 1849 – August 2, 1929) was an American architect known primarily for his institutional buildings but also for his domestic and commercial structures. His best known work is the David R. Francis Quadrangle the historic center of the University of Missouri including Jesse Hall. He also designed state correctional schools in Boonville, Chillicothe, and Tipton; and state mental hospitals in Fulton, Higginsville, and Nevada. Bell, a democrat, was also active in civic life, especially Masonic organizations. He trained and employed William Lincoln Garver as an assistant. Garver would later go on to have a stand-alone career.

Notable works
Jesse Hall the main building of the University of Missouri, listed as part of the Francis Quadrangle Historic District on the National Register of Historic Places
M. Fred Bell Rental Cottage in Fulton, Missouri, listed on the National Register of Historic Places
M. Fred Bell Speculative Cottage in Fulton, Missouri, listed on the National Register of Historic Places
Brandon-Bell-Collier House in Fulton, Missouri, listed on the National Register of Historic Places
Chillicothe Industrial Home for Girls in Chillicothe, Missouri, listed on the National Register of Historic Places
Court Street Historic Residential District in Fulton, Missouri, listed on the National Register of Historic Places
Downtown Fulton Historic District in Fulton, Missouri, listed on the National Register of Historic Places
Missouri State Penitentiary Warden's House in Jefferson City, Missouri, listed on the National Register of Historic Places

See also
National Register of Historic Places listings in Boone County, Missouri

References

Sources
Ohman, Marian M. Initial Study of Architect M.F. Bell, 1849–1929, His Contributions to the State of Missouri. Columbia: University of Missouri, 1970.
Christensen, Lawrence O., William E. Foley, Gary R. Kremer, and Kenneth H. Winn, eds. Dictionary of Missouri Biography. Columbia: University of Missouri Press, 1999. pp. 55–56 
"General Bell Left His Imprint on Missouri." Fulton Sun-Gazette. April 27, 1980. p. 12.

1849 births
1929 deaths
19th-century American architects
People from Fulton, Missouri
University of Missouri people
Architecture in Columbia, Missouri
Architects from Missouri
Fellows of the American Institute of Architects
People from Hagerstown, Maryland
American Freemasons
20th-century American architects
Architects from Maryland